Murmidang is a village in Darjeeling district, West Bengal, India. It has 106 houses. The Rammam river flows from this place.

Geography
The following areas surround Murmidang: north - Kolbong; south - Rammam river; west - Sikkim; east - Dharbari. Prakash Khel maidan, established in 2000, is the main playground of Murmidang.

Agriculture
Murmidang is famous for rice (paddy) cultivation. Other agricultural products include corn, millet, beans and potato. Squash farming is on the rise. Orange is a cultivated here. All vegetables and fruits are supplied to markets in Siliguri.

Population
The total population of the village is about 1000.

Villages in Darjeeling district